Ato Austin was a Ghanaian politician. He was a member of the Provisional National Defence Council (PNDC) military government which ruled after the overthrow of the Limann government in December 1981. He held various portfolios in the government led by Jerry Rawlings.

Politics
Ato Austin was the Secretary-General of the Youth Wing of the People's National Party (PNP) before going into government. After the PNDC was formed, Austin was among several student leaders and activists who were given appointments at various levels in Ghana. Austin was initially appointed the Secretary for Information in January 1982. 
Kwame Karikari, a former  Director General of the Ghana Broadcasting Corporation which runs GTV disclosed how he lobbied Austin as Secretary for Information and Rawlings leading to the country seeking a grant from Japan for the switch to colour TV transmission in Ghana from 1985.

Following a reshuffle in 1983, Austin was appointed Secretary for Labour and Social Welfare Later in September 1982, he gave assurances that the Public Tribunals created by the PNDC government would not use "unorthodox" measures in their functions.

Austin served as Secretary for Youth and Sports between 1986 and 1988.

He also served as Central Regional secretary under Flight Lieutenant Jerry Rawlings. He is credited to have inspired the creation of walkways for tourism purposes in the region such as the Kakum National Park among others after a visit to Malaysia where he saw canopy walkway.

Awards
Osabarimba Royal Award (posthumous) for services as former Central Regional Secretary

Death
Austin died in London in December 1998.

See also 
Provisional National Defence Council

References 

Year of birth missing
1998 deaths
Ghanaian politicians
People's National Party (Ghana) politicians